Nag's Head is a locality within the Holloway area of the London Borough of Islington.

Toponymy
The area is named after the Nag's Head public house. The pub, also previously called the Mustang Diner and O'Neills, closed in 2004; the original early Victorian building is in use today as a gambling establishment.

Governance
Nag's Head Town Centre, a shopping arcade between Morrisons and Selby's, is governed by the Nag's Head Town Centre Management Group.

Geography
The name refers to the junction of Holloway Road (the A1) with Seven Sisters Road, where the Nag's Head pub stood, and also to the surrounding area, particularly the stretch of Holloway Road between the former pub and its junction with Camden Road.

Economy
The area is identified in the London Plan as one of 35 major centres in Greater London. The shopping and entertainment area includes the Nag's Head Market (behind Holloway Road on the northwest corner of Hertslet Road) and the Nag's Head Shopping Centre. It hosts a James Selby department store.

In 1975, McDonalds chose Nags Head to open their second restaurant in the UK, (the first being in Woolwich) situated at the former Burtons Mensware store in Seven Sisters Road.

References

Areas of London
Districts of the London Borough of Islington
Major centres of London